Joseph Dalton (born 1915) was an English professional footballer who played as a left half.

Career
Born in Bradford, Dalton played for Bradford City and Shrewsbury Town. For Bradford City he made 17 appearances in the Football League, scoring 3 goals; he also made 1 appearance in the FA Cup.

Sources

References

1915 births
Year of death missing
English footballers
Bradford City A.F.C. players
Shrewsbury Town F.C. players
English Football League players
Association football wing halves